The 2021 Segunda División B play-offs (Playoffs de Ascenso or Promoción de Ascenso) were the final play-offs for promotion from 2020–21 Segunda División B to the 2021–22 Segunda División. Due to the new format, the three first placed teams in each one of the five promotion groups, along with the best fourth placed team qualified for the promotion play-offs.

Venues
On 30 April 2021, the Royal Spanish Football Federation announced that the play-offs would be played in four locations of Extremadura.

Format
For the last time four teams promoted from Segunda División B to Segunda División. Since the 2021–22 season the promotion will be played in the Primera División RFEF. The competition for these places is reserved this season for the first three classified from each of the five groups that make up the entire Segunda B, as well as the best fourth classified that was resolved by a final score based on points per game. There being odd groups this season, the champions' route that gave a double chance of promotion to teams that were group champions is eliminated.

After a season marked by the limitations derived from the COVID-19 pandemic, the RFEF decided to carry out the promotion in a format like the previous season's. It was developed through the elimination system, a single match. It took place in Extremadura, in a concentration format, and consisted of two qualifying rounds in which the matches were determined by drawing lots, pitting those who would have obtained a better classification against those who would have obtained a worse classification, avoiding, as far as possible, that they face each other two teams that would have belonged to the same group.

In case of a tie there would have been overtime. If the tie persisted, the highest ranked team in the regular phase would have passed, with penalties to follow if both teams finished in the same position of their group.

The four winning clubs of the second round were promoted to the Segunda División. The remaining clubs were assigned to the Primera División RFEF next season.

First round

Qualified teams

Matches

|}

Second round

Qualified teams

Matches

{{OneLegResult|Badajoz|| 0–1 |Amorebieta}}
|}

Promoted teams
The 24 teams that were promoted to Primera División RFEF through promotion groups, the eight first round losers, and the four second round losers are included.
All 36 clubs from Segunda División B qualified for the first time ever to the new third tier.

References

Segunda División B play-offs
2020–21 Segunda División B
2021 Spanish football leagues play-offs